Robert Grant is an English comedy writer, television producer and co-creator of Red Dwarf. Since Red Dwarf, Grant has written two television series, The Strangerers and Dark Ages, and four solo novels, his most recent being Fat. During his career Grant has been involved in two distinct writing partnerships: the first with Doug Naylor, and the second and most recent with Andrew Marshall.

Early life
Grant was born in Salford and studied Psychology at Liverpool University for two years.

Career
In the mid-1980s, Grant collaborated with co-writer Doug Naylor on radio programmes such as Son Of Cliché, Wrinkles for Radio 4 and television programmes such as Spitting Image, The 10 Percenters, and various projects for Jasper Carrott.

The 'Grant Naylor' collaboration, as it had become known, created the cult science-fiction comedy series, Red Dwarf, which evolved from Dave Hollins: Space Cadet, a recurring sketch within Son Of Cliché. Grant was briefly seen (uncredited) in an episode of Red Dwarf entitled "Backwards" (1989), as a man who 'un-smoked' a cigarette. In the mid-1990s, the 'Grant Naylor' collaboration was ended when Grant left Red Dwarf after the sixth series, citing creative differences ("... it was basically 'musical differences' ...") with Doug Naylor. His main reason however, he said, was that he 'wished to have more on his 'tombstone' than Red Dwarf on its own'.

In 2018, Grant collaborated with Andrew Marshall to produce, direct and write the BBC Radio 4 Series, "The Quanderhorn Xperimentations" - and also the novel version published by Gollancz Publishers.

In 2021, it was announced that Grant had written a short Red Dwarf script, Into the Gloop, which was performed live via Zoom on the 7th February 2021 as part of the Official Red Dwarf Fan Club's Holly Hop convention.

Writing credits

Bibliography
 Red Dwarf (1989), co-written with Doug Naylor (published under the joint pseudonym Grant Naylor); sometimes referred to as Red Dwarf: Infinity Welcomes Careful Drivers.
 Better Than Life (1990), co-written with Doug Naylor (published under the joint pseudonym Grant Naylor).
 Primordial Soup (1993), co-written with Doug Naylor (collection of scripts from the TV show Red Dwarf)
 Son Of Soup (1996), co-written with Doug Naylor (second volume of Red Dwarf scripts)
 Scenes From The Dwarf (1996), co-written with Doug Naylor (Making of Red Dwarf)
 Backwards (1996), a sequel to Better Than Life.
 Colony (2000), a science fiction story about a colony that has long since lost its way.
 Incompetence (2003), a wry detective story set in the near future where it is illegal to discriminate for any reason, even incompetence.
 Fat (2006), a darkly comic novel about how the media portrays obesity and its effects on today's society.
 The Quanderhorn Xperimentations (2018), with Andrew Marshall, a science fiction story set in 1952 with echoes of Quatermass.
 The Nether Regions (2019), with Andrew Marshall (BBC Radio 4)

References

External links

 
 
 

Year of birth missing (living people)
Living people
English comedy writers
English science fiction writers
People from Salford
English television writers
Writers from Manchester
Alumni of the University of Liverpool